Carlos Madrid (born December 7, 1977 in Ciudad Juárez, Chihuahua, Mexico) is a Mexican professional boxer in the Light Welterweight division.

Pro career
One of his best performances in the ring was against an undefeated Puerto Rican, Mike Gonzalez. The fight would end in a draw but many ringside thought that Madrid should have received the victory.

In May 2007, Carlos lost to the undefeated Mexican American Brandon Rios in Isleta Casino & Resort, Albuquerque, New Mexico.

On March 28, 2008 Madrid lost to the undefeated Mexican American John Molina jr. in City of Industry, California.

References

External links

Sportspeople from Ciudad Juárez
Boxers from Chihuahua (state)
Light-welterweight boxers
1977 births
Living people
Mexican male boxers